Hollywood Reservation, formerly known as the Dania Reservation, is one of six Seminole Indian reservations governed by the federally recognized Seminole Tribe of Florida, located near Hollywood, Florida. The reservation is bordered by the communities of Hollywood and Davie, in Broward County.

Reservations
Other Seminole Tribe of Florida reservations are:
Big Cypress Reservation, the largest territory, including 81.972 sq mi (212.306 km2), in Broward and Hendry Counties
Brighton Reservation, 57,090 sq mi (147,862 km2), in Glades County
Tampa Reservation in Hillsborough County
Immokalee Reservation in Collier County
Fort Pierce Reservation, a  site in St. Lucie County, taken into trust for the tribe in 1995 by the United States Department of the Interior.

Notes

References
 Pritzker, Barry M. A Native American Encyclopedia: History, Culture, and Peoples. Oxford: Oxford University Press, 2000. .

External links
 Seminole Tribe of Florida, official website

American Indian reservations in Florida
Populated places in Broward County, Florida
Seminole Tribe of Florida